Eugenio María de Hostos School (Spanish: Escuela Eugenio María de Hostos) is a historic early 20th century school located in Las Marías, Puerto Rico.

History 
The school building was designed in the Mission Spanish Revival style and built in 1938. Funding for the construction came from the Puerto Rico Reconstruction Administration, a New Deal agency. The school was designed by Puerto Rican State Architect Rafael Carmoega. 

It was added to the United States National Register of Historic Places on December 19, 2012.

References 

School buildings on the National Register of Historic Places in Puerto Rico
1938 establishments in Puerto Rico
School buildings completed in 1938
Spanish Revival architecture in Puerto Rico
Mission Revival architecture in Puerto Rico
Las Marías, Puerto Rico
Puerto Rico Reconstruction Administration